Grapes from the Estate is an album by Australian musician Oren Ambarchi. It was first released on CD by Touch Music in 2004, then on double LP by Southern Lord in 2006. A vinyl reissue on Black Truffle Records was released in 2018.

Track listing

References

2004 albums
Southern Lord Records albums
Touch Music albums
Oren Ambarchi albums